Colonia Emiliano Zapata or simply Emiliano Zapata, is a community in the municipality of Pabellón de Arteaga, it is located in the coordinates , in the western part of the municipality, it has a population of 3,316 inhabitants during the 2020 Mexico Census.

References 

Populated places in Aguascalientes